This article is a list of Legion of Super-Heroes publications. The list is in approximate chronological order.

Legion volumes
The Legion of Super-Heroes became a regular feature in Adventure Comics with issue #300, but were relegated to back-up feature beginning with issues #381. The Superboy comic book changed its title to Superboy starring the Legion of Super-Heroes with issue number #197. The name later underwent a slight change to Superboy and the Legion of Super-Heroes. 

In 1973, a four issue limited series titled Legion of Super-Heroes published reprints of stories that originally appeared in Adventure Comics and Action Comics. From a publishing standpoint, the limited series is Legion of Super-Heroes Volume 1.

Beginning with issue #259, Superboy and the Legion of Super-Heroes changed its title, dropping the "Superboy" and becoming simply Legion of Super-Heroes. This generally is considered Legion of Super-Heroes Volume 2.

In 1984, DC Comics began publishing first-run titles in a new, advanced printing format on heavier paper (with a concomitant price increase).  The company launched a new title, Legion of Super-Heroes, in the high-resolution format, beginning with issue #1 in August 1984. This became known as Legion of Super-Heroes Volume 3.  The original comic book continued publication, however, changing its name to Tales of the Legion of Super-Heroes with issue #314. Tales of the Legion of Super-Heroes is considered a continuation of Volume 2. It ceased publication in December 1989. During the latter part of its run, Legion of Super-Heroes Volume 3 ran several story lines which retconned the team's history in order to deal with changes in the DC Comics universe wrought by the 1985–1986 crossover known as Crisis on Infinite Earths. These changes removed Superboy (as previously known) from DC Comics. Because the Legion's history was so interwoven with Superboy, a "pocket universe" Superboy was created by the Legion villain Time Trapper. The latter part of Volume 3 is thus known as the "pocket universe Legion". Legion of Super-Heroes Volume 3 ceased publication with issue #63.

A new book, Legion of Super-Heroes, began publication in November 1989. This is generally known as Volume 4. Set five years after the events of Volume 3, this publication covers what is known as the "Five Years Later" Legion. In 1994, the superhero team's continuity came to an end with Legion of Super-Heroes Volume 4, #61, after the DC Comics crossover story Zero Hour: Crisis in Time. Beginning with issue #62, the publication covered stories regarding what is known as the "Reboot Legion".  Legion of Super-Heroes Volume 4 ceased in March 2000. Part of the superhero team's exploits were continued in the new comic book The Legion, which began publication in December 2001 and ceased in October 2004. Another part of the team's adventures were covered in a limited series comic, Legion Lost, which began publication in May 2000 and ceased in April 2001. Neither publication is considered to be part of Legion of Super-Heroes Volume 4 or Volume 5.

Yet another new publication, Legion of Super-Heroes, began in February 2005. With the team's origins retconned yet again, this is known as the period of the "Threeboot Legion". Due to the events of the DC Comics crossover story Infinite Crisis in 2005, Supergirl travels to the 30th century for an extended period. Beginning with issue #16, the publication changed its title to Supergirl and the Legion of Super-Heroes. This is considered a continuation of Legion of Super-Heroes Volume 5. The publication returned to its original title with issue #37. Volume 5 ceased publication with issue #50 during the events of yet another DC Comics universe-wide event, known as Final Crisis (published from July 2008 to March 2009).

A new comic book, Legion of Super-Heroes, began publication in July 2010. This is generally known as Volume 6, and restores (mostly) the continuity of the 1958-to-1994 Legion team—generally called the "Retroboot Legion". This publication ceased in October 2011 after yet another DC Comics universe-wide reboot known as Flashpoint (published from May to September 2011).

A new publication to bear the title Legion of Super-Heroes was first issued in November 2011. This is generally known as Volume 7, and was part of DC Comics' "soft reboot" known as "The New 52". It largely maintained the continuity of Volume 6. This publication ceased in October 2013.

The most recent incarnation of the Legion of Superheroes began with a 2 issue special series titled "Legion of Superheroes Millennium Edition" which introduced a new run of "Legion of Superheroes" which started monthly in November 2019 and is expected to last for 12 months.

Original continuity

Adventure Comics #247, 267, 282, 290, 293, 300–380
Action Comics #267, 276, 287, 289, 377–392, 591
Superboy #86, 89, 98, 117, 147, 172, 173, 176, 183, 184, 188, 190, 191, 193, 195
Superman (Volume 1) #147
Legion of Super-Heroes (vol. 1) #1–4 (reprints)
Superboy and the Legion of Super-Heroes #197–258
Karate Kid #1–15
All-New Collectors' Edition #C-55 (Superboy and the Legion of Super-Heroes tabloid)
Legion of Super-Heroes (vol. 2) #259–313, Annual #1–3
Best of Blue Ribbon Digest #24 (New Story, appears between #287 and #288 of Legion of Super-Heroes (vol. 2))
Secrets of the Legion of Super-Heroes #1–3
Tales of the Legion of Super-Heroes #314–325 (#326–354 are reprints of Legion of Super-Heroes (vol. 3))
Legion of Super-Heroes (vol. 3) #1–63, Annual #1–4 (Baxter series)
Legion of Substitute Heroes Special #1
Legionnaires 3 #1–4
Cosmic Boy #1–4
Superman (vol. 2) #8
Action Comics #591
Who's Who in the Legion of Super-Heroes #1–7

Legion members appearing during "Absolute Power":
Superman/Batman #14–18

5 Years Later (includes original and Batch SW6 teams)
Legion of Super-Heroes (vol. 4) #1–61, Annual #1–5
Legionnaires #1–18, Annual #1
L.E.G.I.O.N. 94 #69
Timber Wolf #1–5
Valor #1–23

Zero Hour Reboot continuity

Legion of Super-Heroes (vol. 4) #0, 62–125, 1000000, Annual #6–7
Legionnaires #0, 19–81, 1000000, Annual #2–3
Legends of the Legion #1–4
Legion Science Police #1–4
Superman Plus the Legion of Super-Heroes #1
Sovereign Seven Plus the Legion of Super-Heroes #1
 Superboy (vol. 3) #21, #45
Adventures of Superman #540
Showcase '95 #6
 Genesis #1-4
The Final Night #1–4
Inferno #1–4
 Action Comics #741
Superman (vol. 2)  #119
Green Lantern (vol. 3) #98-99
Showcase '96 #8 #10–12
Adventure Comics 80 pages Special #1
Legion Lost #1–12
Legion Worlds #1–6
The Legion #1–38
Legion of Super-Heroes Secret Files #1-2
The Legion Secret Files 3003
Teen Titans (vol. 3) #15–16
Titans/Legion of Super-Heroes: Universe Ablaze #1–4
Teen Titans/Legion Special #1
Infinite Crisis #6
Final Crisis: Legion of 3 Worlds #1–5
Young Justice: Our Worlds At War #1

Threeboot continuity

Teen Titans/Legion Special #1
Legion of Super-Heroes (vol. 5) #1–15
Supergirl and the Legion of Super-Heroes #16–36
Action Comics #850
Legion of Super-Heroes (vol. 5) #37–50
The Brave and the Bold (vol. 2) #4–6
Final Crisis: Legion of 3 Worlds #1–5

Post-Infinite Crisis "Retroboot" team
Justice League of America (vol. 2) #8–10
Justice Society of America (vol. 3) #5–6
Action Comics #858–864
Countdown #50–48, 45, 42–41, 39–37, 35–34, 31–27 (descending numerical order)
Countdown to Final Crisis #26–23, 21–20, 15–13, 11–6 (descending numerical order)
Supergirl (vol. 5) #21–22, 52, Annual #2
Adventure Comics Special Featuring Guardian
Final Crisis: Legion of 3 Worlds #1–5
Adventure Comics (vol. 2) #1–12 (renumbered to vol. 1 #516–529)
Legion of Super-Heroes (vol. 6) #1–16
Legion of Super-Villains #1
Legion of Super-Heroes (vol. 7) #1–23, 0
Legion Lost (vol. 2) #1–16, 0
Legion: Secret Origin #1–6
Star Trek / Legion of Super-Heroes #1–6
Justice League United, Annual #1 #6–10
Convergence: Superboy and the Legion of Super-Heroes #1-2

Post-Rebirth team 

 Legion of Super-Heroes: Millennium #1-2 
 Legion of Super-Heroes (vol. 8) #1-12
 Justice League vs. Legion of Super-Heroes #1-6
 Future State: Legion of Super-Heroes #1-2

Other comic books
Adventures in the DC Universe #10
Legion of Super Heroes in the 31st Century #1–20

Collected editions

See also
List of Legion of Super-Heroes members

References

External links

Legion Publication History at the Legion Wiki

Lists of comics by DC Comics